Kera or KERA may refer to:

Places
 Kera, Kutch, a village in Bhuj Taluka of Kutch district of Gujarat, India
 Kera Swaminarayan Mandir
 Kera, Kōchi Prefecture, Japan
 Kera (Bondokuy, Burkina Faso), a village in the Bondokuy department of Burkina Faso
 , a village in the Yaba Department of Burkina Faso
 Kera railway station, a railway station in Espoo, Finland

Other
 KERA (FM), a radio station (90.1 FM) licensed to Dallas, Texas
 KERA-TV, a television station (virtual channel 13/RF channel 14) licensed to Dallas, Texas
 Kentucky Education Reform Act
 Kentucky Equal Rights Association
 Kera language, a language spoken in southwest Chad and north Cameroon
 Kera, Yaba
 Keratocan, a human protein in the cornea
 Tiiu Kera (born 1945), United States Air Force major general
 Kera, a cloth belt which is used to tie the gho, the national dress for men in Bhutan

See also
 Kira (disambiguation)
 Keira (disambiguation)
 Kiera
 Kaira (disambiguation)